"Clothes Off!!" is the fifth single from Gym Class Heroes' third album, As Cruel as School Children. It features vocalist Patrick Stump of Fall Out Boy. It was released in June 2007, and peaked at number 46 on the Billboard Hot 100. Outside of the United States, "Clothes Off" peaked within the top ten of the charts in Finland, the Republic of Ireland, and the United Kingdom.

The original hook for the song is from Jermaine Stewart's 1986 single "We Don't Have to Take Our Clothes Off".

A remix to the song was released in November 2008 featuring rappers Reef the Lost Cauze and Ghostface Killah of Wu-Tang Clan.

Music video
The video starts with the band driving up to a casino with the song "Viva La White Girl" playing. After checking into their rooms, Travie McCoy makes his way down to the casino floor and runs into an Elvis impersonator, played by Pete Wentz, playing a slot machine. Travie engages in a game of strip poker with several girls, and seemingly wins, as he is the only one that remains dressed. It all turns into a party with Elvis performing on a stage. About halfway through the video, Travis encounters people dressed like animals in the hotel, presumably furries at a convention. A dance-off then takes place with the fursuiters, who are afterwards revealed to be the members of Panic! at the Disco (Ryan Ross as the orange lion, Brendon Urie as the black and white dog, Jon Walker as the bear, and Spencer Smith as the seal).

Other cameos include Patrick Stump as a crowd member, and entrepreneur Johnny Cupcakes. British rapper Dizzee Rascal is also visible with some women for a few short seconds.

Track listings
UK CD 1
 "Clothes Off!!" (explicit album version)
 "Shoot Down the Stars" (recorded live at Fopp)

UK CD 2
 "Clothes Off!!" (explicit album version)
 "On My Own Time (Write On)" (recorded live at Fopp)
 "Clothes Off!!" (video)
 "The Queen and I" (video)

UK vinyl
 "Clothes Off!!" (explicit album version)
 "Etched B-Side"

AU CD
 "Clothes Off!!" (radio version)
 "The Queen and I" (live acoustic)
 "Boomerang Theory"

Charts

Weekly charts

Year-end charts

See also
 Furry fandom

References

2006 songs
2007 singles
Fueled by Ramen singles
Gym Class Heroes songs
Patrick Stump songs
Songs written by Sam Hollander
Songs written by Dave Katz
Songs written by Travie McCoy
Song recordings produced by S*A*M and Sluggo